North Warwickshire Borough Council elections are held every four years. North Warwickshire Borough Council is the local authority for the non-metropolitan district of North Warwickshire in Warwickshire, England. Since the last boundary changes in 2003, 35 councillors have been elected from 17 wards.

Political control
The first elections were held in 1973, initially operating as a shadow authority until the new arrangements came into effect on 1 April 1974. Political control of the council since 1974 has been held by the following parties:

Leadership
The leaders of the council since 2009 have been:

Council elections
1973 North Warwickshire Borough Council election
1976 North Warwickshire Borough Council election
1979 North Warwickshire Borough Council election (New ward boundaries)
1983 North Warwickshire Borough Council election
1987 North Warwickshire Borough Council election
1991 North Warwickshire Borough Council election (Borough boundary changes took place but the number of seats remained the same)
1995 North Warwickshire Borough Council election (Borough boundary changes took place but the number of seats remained the same)
1999 North Warwickshire Borough Council election
2003 North Warwickshire Borough Council election (New ward boundaries)
2007 North Warwickshire Borough Council election
2011 North Warwickshire Borough Council election
2015 North Warwickshire Borough Council election
2019 North Warwickshire Borough Council election

Borough result maps

By-elections

2019-2023

Parish Council by-elections

2019-2023

References

External links

 
Borough of North Warwickshire
Council elections in Warwickshire
District council elections in England